Romina Oprandi was the defending champion, but chose not to participate. 
Sorana Cîrstea won the tournament by defeating Silvia Soler-Espinosa in the final 6–2, 6–2.

Seeds

Main draw

Finals

Top half

Bottom half

External links
 Main Draw
 Qualifying Draw

Open GDF Suez de Bretagne - Singles
L'Open 35 de Saint-Malo